This page lists the World Best Year Performances in the year 1980 in the Marathon for both men and women. One of the main events during this season were the 1980 Summer Olympics in Moscow, Soviet Union, where the final of the men's competition was held on Friday August 1, 1980. The competition had an entry list of 76 competitors, with 53 runners actually finishing the race.

Norway's Grete Waitz clocked 2:25:41 winning the New York City Marathon on October 26, 1980, but her time was disputed and therefore not recognized as a world record because remeasurements of a nearly identical course in 1981 was 150 m short.

Men

Records

1980 World Year Ranking

Women

Records

1980 World Year Ranking

References
digilander.libero

External links
1980 Marathon Ranking by the ARRS

1980
 Marathon